Adzhosuchus is an extinct genus of crocodylomorph in the family Shartegosuchidae. Fossils have been found from southwestern Mongolia that date back to the Late Jurassic period.

References

Late Jurassic crocodylomorphs
Late Jurassic reptiles of Asia
Prehistoric pseudosuchian genera